The United States competed at the 1992 Winter Olympics in Albertville, France.

Competitors
The following is the list of number of competitors in the Games.

Medalists

The following U.S. competitors won medals at the games. In the by discipline sections below, medalists' names are bolded.

| width="78%" align="left" valign="top" |

| width=22% align=left valign=top |

Alpine skiing

Timed events
Men

Women

Combined

Biathlon

Men

Women

Bobsleigh

Cross-country skiing

Men

Women

Curling

Curling was a demonstration sport at the 1992 Winter Olympics.

Figure skating

Individual

Mixed

Freestyle skiing

Men

Women

Ice hockey

Summary

Roster
Ray LeBlanc
Scott Gordon
Greg Brown
Guy Gosselin
Sean Hill
Scott Lachance
Dave Tretowicz
Moe Mantha
Clark Donatelli
Ted Donato
Ted Drury
David Emma
Steve Heinze
Jim Johannson
Shawn McEachern
Marty McInnis
Joe Sacco
Tim Sweeney
C. J. Young
Scott Young
Head Coach: Dave Peterson

First round
Twelve participating teams were placed in two groups. After playing a round-robin, the top four teams in each group advanced to the Medal Round while the last two teams competed in the consolation round for the 9th to 12th places.

Quarterfinal

Semifinal

Bronze medal game

Luge

Men

Women

Nordic combined

Short track speed skating

Qualification legend: FA – Qualify to medal round.

Ski jumping

Speed skating

Men

Women

Demonstration sports

Curling
Tim Somerville (fourth)
Mike Strum (third)
Bud Somerville(skip)
Bill Strum (lead)
Bob Nichols (alternate)

References

Official Olympic Reports
 
 Olympic Winter Games 1992, full results by sports-reference.com

Nations at the 1992 Winter Olympics
1992
Oly